The island of Jersey is located in the Channel Islands and consists of a number of small towns, villages and uninhabited islands. Jersey is divided into twelve administrative parishes which are further subdivided into vingtaines, with Saint Ouen being the exception which uses cueillettes.

Places by parish

Grouville 

 Minquiers

Saint Brélade 

 Saint Aubin

Saint Clément 

 La Motte

Saint Helier 

 Saint Helier Marina

Saint John 

 Bonne Nuit

Saint Lawrence

Saint Martin 

 Écréhous
 Gorey

Saint Mary 

 Pierres de Lecq

Saint Ouen

Saint Peter

Saint Saviour

Trinity

References 

Geography of Jersey
Jersey-related lists